The Kirk Cup is the oldest hockey tournament in Ulster and the oldest provincial hockey trophy in Ireland. It has become a tradition since the 1966-67 season for the final to be played on Boxing Day, a date previously reserved for the Anderson Cup Final. The final attracts the largest crowd of the Ulster hockey season. The cup is named after its donor, Mr. John Kirk, J.P, who was a member of the Antrim club. Following the creation of the Irish Hockey League, the competition remained open only to Ulster Senior League members, until 2018-19, when Irish Hockey League teams from Ulster were admitted.

In the early years of the competition it was also known as the Ulster Senior Challenge Cup.

Historical format

From the introduction of the Cup in the 1897-98 season until the major re-organisation of the Ulster Senior League for the 1969-70 season, the format was that of a knockout competition. The Cup was competed for towards the end of the season.

From the 1969-70 all the teams in Senior League Section One and Two were split into four groups. The winner of each group would go forward to an open draw for semi-final matches.

From the 2000-01 until the 2008-09 season, the format of the competition was altered slightly. The eight teams in the Ulster Premier Hockey League were drawn into four groups. The top eight teams from Section One were drawn into these groups to create four groups of four teams each. The eight Section One teams were the relegated Premier League team from the previous season and the teams finishing in second to eighth places in the final league standings of the previous season.

Each club played the other teams in their Group once. The winners of each Group proceed to semi-final matches, with the ties decided via an open draw.

The Premier League reverted to ten teams for the 2009-10 season and these teams together with the top six teams in Section One were drawn into four groups of four teams. Each team played the other teams in their group once. The group winners contested the semi-final with the ties decided by an open draw. The two semi-final winners contested the final which is scheduled for Boxing Day. This format was used in 2010-11 too.

Current format

For the start of the 2011-12 season the entry was restricted to the Premier League teams. The ten Premier League teams were drawn in two pools of five teams, with each team playing the other teams in their pool once. The semi-finals saw the winner of one pool playing the runner-up of the other pool, with the winners of the semi-finals going on to contest the final. In 2016-17, the top sixteen teams in the Ulster Senior League were drawn into four groups of four, but since 2017-18 it has reverted to two groups of five.

Finals

(records incomplete)

1890s

1900s

1910s

1920s

1930s

1940s

1950s

1960s

1970s

1980s

1990s

2000s

2010s

2020s

Sources

External links
 Ulster Branch of Irish Hockey Association

Field hockey competitions in Ulster
1897 establishments in Ireland
Field hockey cup competitions in Ireland